B. G. Kher became the Prime Minister of the Bombay Presidency for the first time on 19 July 1937. The 7-member government resigned in November 1939 to protest the inclusion of British India in the Second World War.

List of ministers
The first Kher ministry consisted of the following:

Parliamentary Secretaries
The ministry additionally included six parliamentary secretaries.
 Gulzarilal Nanda
 B. M. Gupte
 Hansa Mehta
 M. P. Patil
 T. R. Nesvi
 B. S. Hiray

References

Indian National Congress
1937 in India
K
Cabinets established in 1937
Cabinets disestablished in 1939
Bombay Presidency